The 2003–04 season was Port Vale's 92nd season of football in the English Football League, and fourth successive season (41st overall) in the Second Division. Brian Horton resigned in February, and was replaced by Martin Foyle. Vale fought for promotion, but finished outside the play-off zone on goal difference. In the FA Cup, Vale narrowly avoided humiliation by beating non-league Ford United after the replay went to extra-time. However Vale exited at the Second Round with defeat to Conference club Scarborough, who also knocked the Vale out of the League Trophy at the First Round. Vale also left the League Cup at the First Round stage. Stephen McPhee was Player of the Year and top-scorer with 27 goals, but he left the club at the end of the season to play abroad. Financial problems still hounded the club, and Chairman Bill Bratt was desperate to attract investment from fans, though he was unwilling to allow one person to have more than 50% of the club's shares.

Overview

Second Division
The pre-season saw Brian Horton bring in three key players on free transfers: George Pilkington (Everton); Jonny Brain (Newcastle United); and Austrian Andreas Lipa (Skoda Xanthi). Meanwhile, promising keeper Mark Goodlad began a lengthy period of time on the sidelines with injuries. Optimism surrounded the club, after the rebuilding of the new squad appeared to had finished after the break-up of the club's previous team due to financial troubles.

The season opened with seven wins in eleven games, earning Brian Horton the Manager of the Month award. Though this was followed by a sequence of five defeats in eight games as the goals dried up, this run included a 5–1 thumping at home to Plymouth Argyle. In November, back-up keeper Dean Delany joined Macclesfield Town on a two-month loan. Vale then were in patchy form until March, though the side managed to do the double over Sheffield Wednesday. Brian Horton resigned in February, with the club in the play-offs. His replacement was former Vale legend Martin Foyle, whose only previous experience was in the club's youth set-up. As his assistant he appointed former teammate, Dean Glover, another club legend. In March, Foyle made his first signing, bringing defender Craig James on loan from Sunderland, and after a few weeks he signed him permanently. Mark Boyd headed out of the club however, and was allowed to sign with Carlisle United. Vale lost just two of their final twelve games, and ran close to a play-off place, only losing out due to their inferior goal difference.

They finished in seventh place with 73 points. They were level on points with Hartlepool United and Swindon Town, but finished outside of the play-off zone due to their inferior goal difference. Stephen McPhee scored 27 goals to become the club's top-scorer, the highest tally since Andy Jones hit 37 in 1986–87. Other major contributions came from Billy Paynter (14), Steve Brooker (8), Marc Bridge-Wilkinson (7) and Adrian Littlejohn (7).

At the end of the season several players left the club: Neil Brisco (Rochdale); Liam Burns (Bristol Rovers); Adrian Littlejohn (Lincoln City); and Dean Delany (Shelbourne). Stephen McPhee also decided to leave the club, and though Chairman Bill Bratt had rejected offers of £100,000 for the player, McPhee exploited a loophole in his contract to join Portuguese side Beira-Mar. Marc Bridge-Wilkinson also turned down a new lower-paying contract, and instead signed with Stockport County. Player-coach Ian Brightwell also left Vale Park, having lost his assistant manager role to Glover, and joined Horton at Macclesfield Town. One boost was that Billy Paynter and George Pilkington put pen to paper on new long-term deals.

Finances
Peter Walker was appointed as Chief Executive in August 2003, having volunteered to work for free for six months. One feature of the season proved to be the long-running courtroom battle between former chairman Bill Bell and owners Valiant2001 over unpaid rent on the club shop. The club's finances were still worrying for supporters, though the problem appeared to have eased by the end of the season.

In December, a Peter Jackson led consortium put a £150,000 investment into the club, which Bratt said "...ensures the future of the club is safe". The club also rejected other investment proposals from confidential sources. Vice-chairman Charles Machin recommended the board sell the club to Italian businessman Gianni Paladini for £530,000, but the board disagreed. In March 2004, Machin and director Geoff Wakefield were voted off the board, as the 'Jackson Five' clique elected Peter Jackson and Stan Meigh in their place. Machin said that "I will not go away. I will haunt the corridors of power like Marley's ghost". However he was never elected back onto the board.

Cup competitions
In the FA Cup, Vale risked humiliation in a 2–2 draw with non-league Ford United at Vale Park. In the replay, Vale had led 1–0 before a last minute equalizer took the game into extra time. Despite having substitute Ian Armstrong's sent off, the "Valiants" escaped the lottery of the penalty shoot-out when on 114 minutes Ford scored an own goal. However, in the Second Round they were still eliminated by a non-league club, when Scarborough's Ashley Sestanovich scored an 80th-minute winner at Vale Park. This meant Scarborough knocked Vale out of the second competition of the season despite playing two leagues below the Vale.

In the League Cup, Vale faced First Division Nottingham Forest. They held Forest to a goalless draw, but were eliminated 3–2 in the subsequent penalty shoot-out.

In the League Trophy, Vale travelled to the McCain Stadium, where they were defeated 2–1 by Conference club Scarborough.

League table

Results
Port Vale's score comes first

Football League Second Division

Results by matchday

Matches

FA Cup

League Cup

League Trophy

Player statistics

Appearances

Top scorers

Transfers

Transfers in

Transfers out

Loans out

References
Specific

General
Soccerbase

Port Vale F.C. seasons
Port Vale